Martín Vargas Morales (born December 12, 1971) is a Puerto Rican politician from the Popular Democratic Party (PPD). Vargas served as Mayor of Guánica for three consecutive terms (2000-2012). He was elected to the Senate of Puerto Rico in 2012.

Vargas Morales was elected mayor of Guánica in the 2000 general elections. Vargas was reelected in 2004 and 2008.

Vargas Morales ran for a seat in the Senate of Puerto Rico stating he was frustrated at how the legislative process worked against the citizens. After winning a spot on the 2012 primaries, he was elected on the general elections to represent the District of Ponce, and subsequently served as senator representing Puerto Rico's District V.

See also
25th Senate of Puerto Rico

References

Living people
Members of the Senate of Puerto Rico
1971 births